Rodney Marc Smith (born March 12, 1970) is a former American football cornerback and safety in the National Football League for the New England Patriots, Carolina Panthers, and Green Bay Packers. He played college football at the University of Notre Dame. In high school, he played running back for Roseville Area High School.

Professional career

He was the second selection in the 1995 NFL Expansion Draft, and first selection for the Panthers in that draft.

References

External links
 NFL.com player page

1970 births
Living people
American football cornerbacks
American football safeties
Notre Dame Fighting Irish football players
New England Patriots players
Carolina Panthers players
Minnesota Vikings players
Green Bay Packers players
Players of American football from Saint Paul, Minnesota
Roseville Area High School alumni